In enzymology, a mannokinase is an enzyme that catalyzes the chemical reaction

ATP + D-mannose  ADP + D-mannose 6-phosphate

Thus, the two substrates of this enzyme are ATP and D-mannose, whereas its two products are ADP and D-mannose 6-phosphate.

This enzyme belongs to the family of transferases, specifically those transferring phosphorus-containing groups (phosphotransferases) with an alcohol group as acceptor.  The systematic name of this enzyme class is ATP:D-mannose 6-phosphotransferase. Other names in common use include mannokinase (phosphorylating), and D-fructose (D-mannose) kinase.  This enzyme participates in fructose and mannose metabolism.

References

 

EC 2.7.1
Enzymes of unknown structure